Borghetto (the diminutive of borgo) is a common Italian place name:
Borghetto d'Arroscia, a commune (Italian comune) in the province of Imperia
Borghetto di Borbera, a commune in the province of Alessandria
Borghetto di Vara, a commune in the province of La Spezia
Borghetto Lodigiano, a commune in the province of Lodi
Borghetto Santo Spirito, a commune in the province of Savona
Borghetto San Nicolò, a former commune in the province of Imperia
Borghetto, a frazione of the commune of Valeggio sul Mincio in the province of Verona
Borghetto, a frazione of the commune of Tuoro sul Trasimeno in the province of Perugia
Borghetto, a frazione of the commune of Piacenza in the province of Piacenza
Borghetto, a frazione of the commune of San Martino di Lupari in the province of Padua
Borghetto, a frazione of the commune of Mozzo in the province of Bergamo
Borghetto, a frazione of the commune of Avio, in the province of Trento